Alfred McAlpine is a company. 

Alfred McAlpine may also refer to: 

Alfred McAlpine Stadium
Alfred McAlpine of the McAlpine baronets
 Alfred McAlpine (businessman) (1881–1944), founder of the construction company Sir Alfred McAlpine & Son
 Alfred James McAlpine (1908–1991), his son